Raymond Alvin Jackson (born 1949) is a Senior United States district judge of the United States District Court for the Eastern District of Virginia.

Education and career

Born in Sussex, Virginia, Jackson received a Bachelor of Arts degree from Norfolk State University in 1970 and a Juris Doctor from the University of Virginia School of Law in 1973. He was in the United States Army, JAG Corps, from 1973 to 1977, attaining the rank of captain. He thereafter remained in the United States Army Reserve, achieving the rank of colonel. He was an Assistant United States Attorney of the Eastern District of Virginia from 1977 to 1993, and was an adjunct lecturer at the College of William and Mary, Marshall-Wythe School of Law, from 1981 to 1991 and in 1993.

Federal judicial service

On September 24, 1993, Jackson was nominated by President Bill Clinton to a seat  on the United States District Court for the Eastern District of Virginia vacated by Richard Leroy Williams. Jackson was confirmed by the United States Senate on November 20, 1993, and received his commission on November 22, 1993. He assumed senior status on November 23, 2021.

Notable cases

Jackson was the district court judge in the critical Supreme Court decision in Kimbrough v. United States (2007).  Derrick Kimbrough was indicted in September 2004 on four drug-related counts: conspiracy to distribute both crack and powder cocaine; possession with intent to distribute more than 50 grams of crack cocaine; possession with intent to distribute powder cocaine; and possession of a firearm in furtherance of a drug trafficking offense. Kimbrough pleaded guilty to all four counts. Under the statutes that define these respective crimes, Kimbrough faced a sentence of between 15 years and life in prison. Based on the facts, Kimbrough admitted at his change-of-plea hearing, as well as the fact that Kimbrough had testified falsely at a codefendant's trial, Jackson computed the applicable range under the federal sentencing guidelines at 228 to 270 months in prison.

Kimbrough's Guidelines range was so high because his offense involved both crack and powder cocaine. Jackson observed that if Kimbrough's crime had involved powder cocaine only, his sentencing range would have been 97 to 106 months. The mandatory minimum sentence, in turn, was 180 months in prison, and Jackson imposed that sentence.

The Fourth Circuit Court of Appeals vacated the sentence and remanded for further proceedings. Relying on a prior opinion, the appellate court stated that any sentence that fell outside the Guidelines range was per se unreasonable if that sentence was based on a policy disagreement with the fact that crack cocaine offenses are punished more harshly than powder cocaine offenses. The United States Supreme Court agreed to review the Fourth Circuit's reasoning in this case and reversed the Fourth Circuit's opinion, holding that the Federal Sentencing Guidelines for cocaine are advisory only, and a judge may consider the disparity between the Guidelines' treatment of crack and powder cocaine offenses when imposing a sentence sufficient, but not greater than necessary.

Personal life
Jackson is married to retired judge Gwendolyn Jackson from the 4th Judicial District of Virginia. Their daughter Candace Jackson-Akiwumi is a judge of the United States Court of Appeals for the Seventh Circuit.

See also 
 List of African-American federal judges
 List of African-American jurists

External links

1949 births
Living people
20th-century American judges
21st-century American judges
African-American judges
Assistant United States Attorneys
College of William & Mary faculty
Judges of the United States District Court for the Eastern District of Virginia
Norfolk State University alumni
People from Sussex County, Virginia
United States district court judges appointed by Bill Clinton
United States Army officers
University of Virginia School of Law alumni